Mashkabad-e Olya (also Romanized as Mashkābād-e ‘Olyā; also known as Mashgābād-e ‘Olyā) is a village in Bakeshluchay Rural District, in the Central District of Urmia County, West Azerbaijan Province, Iran. At the 2006 census, its population was 135, in 41 families.

References 

Populated places in Urmia County